A list of films produced in the Cinema of Portugal ordered by year of release in the 1940s. For an alphabetical list of Portuguese films see :Category:Portuguese films

1940s

External links
 Portuguese film at the Internet Movie Database

1940s
Films
Portuguese